In September 1943, the British government asked neurologist Ludwig Guttmann to establish the National Spinal Injuries Centre at Stoke Mandeville Hospital in Buckinghamshire. When the centre opened in 1944, Guttmann was appointed its director and held the position until 1966. Sport was introduced as part of the total rehabilitation programme for patients at the centre, starting with darts, snooker, punchball, and skittles, followed by archery.

Guttmann organised the first Stoke Mandeville Games for paraplegic persons in the form of an archery demonstration with two teams, which took place on 29 July 1948, the same day as the start of the 1948 Summer Olympics in London. Netball was then added as an event in 1949, and javelin throw in 1950. Snooker was first introduced into the Stoke Mandeville Games in 1951 and was included in every annual event up to 1959.

Guttmann originally used the term Paraplegic Games, a name that eventually developed into the "Paralympic Games" (or "Paralympics"), which were first held in Rome alongside the Summer Olympics in 1960.

Snooker was included at the inaugural Summer Paralympics of 1960, held in Rome. The event took place outdoors in a covered area of a running track, on a table that was sent over from Stoke Mandeville Hospital. With the exception of 1980, snooker was then contested at each subsequent Summer Paralympics until 1988, a total of seven Paralympic Games.

Snooker was only open to male competitors at the Paralympics. Over its Paralympic history, the event was dominated by Great Britain, who won eight gold medals in the sport, three of which were awarded to Nottinghamshire player Michael Shelton.

Medal winners

Men

1960

1964

1968

1972

1976

1984

1988

Medal table

Notes

References

External links
Snooker. National Paralympic Heritage Trust.
Snooker chasing Paralympic dream. BBC video (6 December 2015) with Nigel Mawner, chairman of World Disability Billiards and Snooker.

 
Sports at the Summer Paralympics